Surface-to-air can refer to:

 Surface to Air, fashion apparel
 Surface to Air Studio, creative agency
 Surface-to-air missile or Surface-to-air artillery
 Fulton surface-to-air recovery system
 Surface to Air, a 2006 rock album by Zombi